StarFish is an American rock band for children from Maplewood, New Jersey. The band's five members are StingRay (lead vocals and guitar); Grateful Dave (Dave Hartkern) (drums and vocals), Moose (Marc Stern) (lead guitar), Dr. Yes (Mark Asch) (keyboards and vocals) and AntFarm (Antar Goodwin) (bass guitar).

Their first CD, StarFish Rocks! was reviewed by Cookie magazine, which called StarFish a "fantastic example" of a "new wave" of artists making smart music for kids today" 

Their two albums have been described as having influences in classic rock groups such as Deep Purple, Cream, Yes, and Pink Floyd, but marketed towards a family audience.

Discography
 2008: Rocks
 2010: Enter Sandbox

External links
 http://www.worldsoundkids.com/starfish/
 http://www.nj.com/entertainment/music/index.ssf/2010/05/five_jersey_fathers_form_a_kid.html

Notes

Rock music groups from New Jersey
American children's musical groups